Qualification for the 2012 Little League World Series took place in eight United States regions and eight international regions from June through August 2012.

United States

Great Lakes
The tournament took place in Indianapolis on August 3–10.

Note: Michigan fell to fifth place based on a tiebreaker of runs scored against divided by innings played.

Mid-Atlantic
The tournament took place in Bristol, Connecticut on August 3–12.

Midwest
The tournament took place in Indianapolis on August 4–11.

Note: The Dakotas are organized into a single Little League district.

New England
The tournament took place in Bristol, Connecticut on August 3–11.

Northwest
The tournament took place in San Bernardino, California on August 3–11.

Southeast
The tournament took place in Warner Robins, Georgia on August 3–10.

Southwest
The tournament took place in Waco, Texas on August 3–9.

West
The tournament took place in San Bernardino, California on August 3–11.

International

Asia-Pacific
The tournament took place in Taichung, Taiwan from July 2–8.

1 Republic of China, commonly known as Taiwan, due to complicated relations with People's Republic of China, is recognized by the name Chinese Taipei by majority of international organizations including Little League Baseball(LLB). For more information, please see Cross-Strait relations.

Canada
The tournament took place in Edmonton, Alberta on August 4–11.

(*): host league

Caribbean
The tournament took place in Guayama, Puerto Rico on July 7–14.

Europe
The tournament took place in Kutno, Poland on July 20–28.

Japan
The first two rounds of the tournament were held on June 30, and the remaining two rounds, originally scheduled for July 7, were played July 15. All games were played in Tokyo.

Latin America
The tournament took place in Aguadulce, Panama on July 8–15.

Mexico
The tournament took place in Monterrey on July 21–26.

Middle East-Africa
The tournament took place in Kutno, Poland on July 13–16.

References

2012 Little League World Series